Bop! is an album by saxophonist Frank Morgan released in 1997 on the Telarc label.

Reception

The review by AllMusic's Scott Yanow said: "Although all eight selections on this CD have been played many times before, altoist Frank Morgan makes each of the pieces sound fresh. ... A fine effort".

JazzTimess Willard Jenkins noted "By no means a frenzied, pot-boiling affair, Morgan takes the time to nurse the nuances of the music. This is a very relaxed-though far from somnambulant-date befitting a man of Morgan’s astute bop immersion. His alto tone is relaxed and confident, and he addresses these lines as if born to them".

Track listing 
 "Milano" (John Lewis) – 6:06
 "Well, You Needn't" (Thelonious Monk) – 6:18
 "K.C. Blues" (Charlie Parker) – 9:10
 "A Night in Tunisia" (Dizzy Gillespie, Frank Paparelli) – 7:56
 "Blue Monk" (Monk) – 5:07
 "Half Nelson" (Miles Davis) – 11:21
 "Lover Man" (Jimmy Davis, Ram Ramirez, James Sherman) – 11:21
 "52nd Street Theme" (Monk) – 9:49

Personnel

Performance
Frank Morgan – alto saxophone
Rodney Kendrick – piano
Curtis Lundy (tracks 1–7), Ray Drummond (track 8) – bass
Leroy Williams – drums

Production
John Snyder – producer

References 

Frank Morgan (musician) albums
1997 albums
Telarc Records albums